St Mary the Virgin’s Church, Braddock or Bradoc is a Grade I listed parish church in the Church of England in Braddock, Cornwall.

History
The current church dates from the 13th to 15th centuries. The font is Norman and there are many good examples of woodcarving in the church: these include the bench ends, part of the rood screen, wagon roofs, an Elizabethan pulpit and two carved panels perhaps of the 18th century.

Parish status
The church is in a joint benefice with:
Boconnoc Church
St Winnow’s Church, St Winnow
St Cyricius and St Julietta's Church, St Veep
St Brevita’s Church, Lanlivery
St Nectan’s Chapel, St Winnow
St Bartholomew's Church, Lostwithiel

Organ
The organ dates from 1885 and was built by Henry Jones of London. A specification of the organ can be found in the National Pipe Organ Register.

Bells
The tower contains a peal of 5 bells all dating from 1845 by Charles and George Mears.

References

Braddock
Braddock